Jean-Pierre Fiala Fiala (born 22 April 1969) is a  Cameroonian former international footballer.

Career

Club career
Fiala played for professional club football for Canon Yaoundé, Larissa, Persma Manado, Stade Brestois and US Avrances.

International career
Fiala represented Cameroon at the 1994 FIFA World Cup.

External links

 

1969 births
Living people
Footballers from Yaoundé
Cameroonian footballers
Cameroon international footballers
1994 FIFA World Cup players
Canon Yaoundé players
Stade Brestois 29 players
Athlitiki Enosi Larissa F.C. players
Expatriate footballers in Indonesia
Association football midfielders